Nasutitermes oculatus, is a species of termite of the genus Nasutitermes. It is found in India and Sri Lanka. It lives within the stems of Dendrocalamus giganteus.

References

Termites
Insects described in 1911
Insects of India